The 1983–84 Primera División B was the second category of the Spanish basketball league system during the 1983–84 season

Format 
14 teams played this season.

14 teams in a round-robin format, the first three are promoted to the Liga ACB, the last four are relegated to Segunda División.
Ties are eliminated.
In case of tie at the end of the game, extensions will be played until one team wins.
Victory is worth 2 points and defeat 1

Teams

Promotion and relegation (pre-season) 
A total of 14 teams contested the league, including 6 sides from the 1982–83 season, one relegated from the 1982–83 Liga Española de Baloncesto, four promoted from the Segunda División and three Wild Cards.

Teams relegated from Liga Española de Baloncesto
Obradoiro Feiraco

Teams promoted from Segunda División
Kanterbrau Dribling
CD Oximesa
CB Llíria
Iveco Gijón

Wild Cards
AB Premià
Breogán Caixa Galicia
CB Gasteiz

Teams that resigned to participate
CD Fortuna sold his place to Atlético de Madrid

Venues and locations

Regular season

References

External links
League at JM Almenzar website
hispaligas.net

Primera División B de Baloncesto
1983–84 in Spanish basketball
Second level Spanish basketball league seasons